Nicholas J. Sacco (born November 17, 1946) is an American Democratic Party politician, who has been serving in the New Jersey State Senate since 1994, where he represents the 32nd Legislative District. Sacco serves in the Senate as the chairman of the Transportation Committee, and is also a member of the Law and Public Safety and Veterans' Affairs Committee. He concurrently serves as mayor of North Bergen as he is allowed to hold two offices under a grandfather clause in a bill that prohibited dual office holding. Sacco announced on February 24, 2022 that he would not seek re-election for state senate.

Personal life
Sacco was born in Jersey City on November 17, 1946. He grew up in West New York, graduating from Memorial High School. Sacco received a B.A. in 1968 in History from Rutgers University and an M.A. in Administration and Supervision from Seton Hall University in 1973. He is married to but does not reside with, the former Kathleen Ambrose since 1972 and together have one son, Nicholas J. Sacco, Jr., a vice principal at North Bergen High School.

Political career
Sacco was first elected to the North Bergen Board of Commissioners in 1985 as a part of recall elections headed up by Leo Gattoni to clean out corrupt officials in the Township. In 1991, Gattoni retired from the Mayor's office and decided to endorse Sacco as mayor (in North Bergen, the mayor is chosen among members of the Board of Commissioners). Sacco has been reelected every four years, most recently in May 2015. Two years after becoming mayor, Sacco defeated incumbent State Senator Thomas F. Cowan in the Democratic primary election for the 32nd district. He has also been overwhelmingly re-elected to this office since his first election as well.

In addition to serving as a State Senator and as mayor of North Bergen, Sacco previously served as the Director of Primary Education for the North Bergen School District, until his retirement from the position in 2017. Sacco has been Principal of Horace Mann and Lincoln School in North Bergen, and former president and vice president of the North Bergen Council of Administrators and Supervisors which is affiliated with the New Jersey Education Association. He simultaneously holds a seat in the New Jersey Senate and as Mayor. This dual position, often called double dipping, is allowed under a grandfather clause in the state law enacted by the New Jersey Legislature and signed into law by Governor of New Jersey Jon Corzine in September 2007 that prevents dual-office-holding but allows those who had held both positions as of February 1, 2008, to retain both posts.

Sacco is a sponsor of the state's Urban Enterprise Zone legislation, which has helped foster private business investment in urban centers and generates millions of dollars in revenue for North Bergen and other cities. Sacco has also sponsored legislation expanding the use of DNA testing in criminal cases, by having DNA collected from individuals convicted of disorderly conduct offenses that could be compared against databases to help close unsolved crime cases. Sacco has an anti-abortion voting record in the Senate as reported by the Democrats for Life of America.

In 2012 the Hudson Reporter named him #1 in its list of Hudson County's 50 most influential people. In 2013 and 2014, he was ranked #3 (the first of which tied him with Senate colleague and Union City mayor Brian P. Stack), and #4 in 2015.

On February 24, 2022, Sacco announced that he would not run for re-election as state senator in 2023, after North Bergen was redistricted to the 33rd Legislative District, which placed Sacco in the same district as his colleague, Union City Mayor and state Senator Brian P. Stack, whom Sacco said he would support.

Committees 
Committee assignments for the current session are:
Law and Public Safety, Vice-Chair
Transportation

District 32 
Each of the 40 districts in the New Jersey Legislature has one representative in the New Jersey Senate and two members in the New Jersey General Assembly.Each of the 40 districts in the New Jersey Legislature has one representative in the New Jersey Senate and two members in the New Jersey General Assembly. Representatives from the 32nd District for the 2022—2023 Legislative Session are:
Senator Nicholas Sacco
Assemblyman Pedro Mejia
Assemblywoman Angelica M. Jimenez

Election history

References

External links

Senator Sacco's legislative web page, New Jersey Legislature
New Jersey Legislature financial disclosure forms
2011 2010 2009 2008 2007 2006 2005 2004

1946 births
Living people
Mayors of places in New Jersey
Memorial High School (West New York, New Jersey) alumni
Democratic Party New Jersey state senators
People from Jersey City, New Jersey
People from North Bergen, New Jersey
People from West New York, New Jersey
Rutgers University alumni
Seton Hall University alumni
21st-century American politicians